Karenjit Kaur – The Untold Story of Sunny Leone is a ZEE5 Original web series. The series captures the journey of former pornstar-turned-actor Sunny Leone, born in a middle-class Sikh family, and her makeover from being an innocent girl to an adult film actress and eventually a Bollywood star. The twenty-episode biopic premiered on the platform on 16 July 2018 on ZEE5 in multiple languages, including Malayalam, Bengali, Tamil, Telugu, Kannada and Marathi.

Description 
The biopic stars Raj Arjun, Rysa Saujani, Karamvir Lamba, Bijay Jasjit Anand, Grusha Kapoor, Vanish Pradhan and Marc Buckner. Karenjit tells her story on her terms, in her inimitable style – one with no regrets. Right from her reasons of getting into the adult industry, choosing the name Sunny to owing meeting her husband to the industry itself.

Directed by Aditya Datt and written by Karan Sharma, the series reveals her history, family, boyfriend-turned-husband Daniel Webber and traces lesser-known facts about her transformation from an adult film star to a popular actress.

The show was primarily shot in Cape Town and Mumbai. The shoot was over by May 2018.

Cast 
 Sunny Leone as Karenjit Kaur Vohra/Karenjit Kaur Weber/Karen Malhotra/Sunny Leone (Herself)
Rysa Saujani as Young Karenjit
 Bijay J. Anand as Jaspal Singh Vohra
 Grusha Kapoor as Balwant Kaur Vohra
 Raj Arjun as Anupam Chaubey, a news anchor
 Karamvir Lamba as Sundeep
Vansh Pradhan as Young Sundeep
 Marc Buckner as Daniel Weber : Karenjit's Husband.
 Johan Badh as Nate
 Joanna Robaczewska as Tanya
Ritu Shivpuri as Neena, Jaspal Singh Vohra's love interest
 Manoj Singh Panwar as Manager

Episodes

Season 1

Season 2

Season 3

Reception 
First Post made a statement that the screenplay of the series is cleverly written and portrayed Karenjit's life perfectly. The writer did a great job by not implying the sexual references and focus more on other aspects of her life. Sunny Leone's performance in her own life story is applaudable as she had to live her life and relive all the good and bad experiences all over again.

Hindustan Times rated the series with 3/5 stars. The main focus of the story is on the girl raised in a conservative Sikh household and her journey from becoming an adult star and entering Bollywood. The series displays her story with a bit of a melodrama that gives it the feel of a daily soap. The actors in the webseries nonetheless, play it subtly.

The Indian Express says that the webseries was surprisingly a smooth ride. They were also critical about a few melodramatic scenes with few moments of poor acting. The series show parts were one can understand that Leone has always been the dignified and hard-working individual she is admired for today. However, Leone hardly has any screen time in the pilot of the series, and she did perform well on screen.

The Quint gave a review of the series getting quite good responses in season 1. The first season shows most parts of Leone's love life. The new season, however, is much more interesting. The most remarkable thing about season 2 is how all the 6 episodes show only bits of Leone’s porn career. The webseries clearly does not have the best production values. Anyhow, the second season makes Karenjit feel more human than ever.

References

External links 
Karenjit Kaur - The Untold Story of Sunny Leone on ZEE5

Hindi-language web series
Indian drama web series
2018 web series debuts
ZEE5 original programming
Works about pornography